Carlos Emiliano Pereira (born 29 November 1986), commonly known as Carlinhos, is a Brazilian footballer who plays as a left back.

Honours
Botafogo
 Campeonato Brasileiro Série B: 2021

Icasa
Campeonato Cearense Série B: 2010

Coritiba
Campeonato Paranaense: 2017

Fortaleza
Campeonato Cearense: 2019, 2020, 2021
Copa do Nordeste: 2019

References

External links

1986 births
Living people
Sportspeople from Piauí
Brazilian footballers
Association football defenders
Campeonato Brasileiro Série A players
Campeonato Brasileiro Série B players
Campeonato Brasileiro Série C players
4 de Julho Esporte Clube players
Sociedade Esportiva Picos players
Barras Futebol Club players
Associação Desportiva Recreativa e Cultural Icasa players
Guarani FC players
Clube Atlético Sorocaba players
Coritiba Foot Ball Club players
Goiás Esporte Clube players
América Futebol Clube (MG) players
Fortaleza Esporte Clube players
Botafogo de Futebol e Regatas players